James R. Redmond (July 14, 1928 − May 11, 2020) was Emeritus Professor of Zoology in the Iowa State University department of Ecology, Evolution and Organismal Biology.

He received his B.S., 1949, Cincinnati; Ph.D., 1954, California (Los Angeles), and is known for his research with Nautilus; he was a researcher at McMurdo Station.
He was the author of the chapter on Respiratory Biology in Nautilus: The Biology and Paleobiology of a Living Fossil / He also wrote 
Comparative crystallography of vertebrate otoconia
Transport of Oxygen by the Blood of the Land Crab, Gecarcinus lateralis
The respiratory function of hemocyanin in crustacea

References

2020 deaths
1928 births
21st-century American zoologists
Iowa State University faculty